Pie Corner is a community in the parish of Saint Lucy, Barbados. It is located in the North Eastern region of the parish.

See also
 List of cities, towns and villages in Barbados

References

Saint Lucy, Barbados
Populated places in Barbados